Ashley Walters may refer to:

Ashley Walters (actor) (born 1982), English rapper and actor
Ashley Walters (artist) (born 1983), South African artist